Shelburne is a provincial electoral district in Nova Scotia, Canada which existed between 1867 and 2013 and since 2021.  Since 2021 and between 1933 and 2013 it has elected one member to the Nova Scotia House of Assembly; from 1867 to 1933 it elected two members.  The electoral district includes Shelburne County in its entirety.

The electoral district was abolished following the 2012 electoral boundary review and was largely replaced by the new electoral districts of Queens-Shelburne and Argyle-Barrington. It was re-created following the 2019 electoral boundary review out of those districts.

Geography
Shelburne has  of landmass.

Members of the Legislative Assembly
The electoral district was represented by the following Members of the Legislative Assembly:

Election results

1867 general election

1871 general election

1874 general election

1878 general election

1882 general election

1886 general election

1890 general election

1894 general election

1897 general election

1901 general election

1906 general election

1911 general election

1916 general election

1920 general election

1925 general election

1928 general election

1933 general election

1937 general election

1941 general election

1945 general election

1949 general election

1953 general election

1956 general election

1960 general election

1963 general election

1967 general election

1970 general election

1974 general election

1978 general election

1981 general election

1984 general election

1988 general election

1993 general election

1998 general election

1999 general election 

 

~In the riding of Shelburne, the Returning Officer had to cast the tie-breaking vote. It went to Cecil O'Donnell

2003 general election

2006 general election

2009 general election

2017 general election (transposed)

2021 general election

References

External links
riding profile

Former provincial electoral districts of Nova Scotia